The fastest swims recorded at the Pan Pacific Swimming Championships are listed by the championships organisers in a list of records. The events are held in a long course (50 m) pool, with the last championships held in Tokyo, Japan in August 2018.

All records were set in finals unless noted otherwise.

Men

Women

Mixed relay

References
General
Pan Pacific Championship Records: Men 24 August 2014 updated
Pan Pacific Championship Records: Women 24 August 2014 updated
Specific

Pan Pacific Championship
Pan Pacific Swimming Championships